Miele is a river of Schleswig-Holstein, Germany. It flows into the North Sea near Meldorf.

See also
List of rivers of Schleswig-Holstein

Rivers of Schleswig-Holstein
0Miele
Rivers of Germany